Ackelia Smith (born 5 February 2002) is a Jamaican track and field athlete who competes internationally in both the long jump and the triple jump.

Career
In June 2022, Smith won the Jamaican national championship in long jump with a jump of 6.56m and finished runner-up in the triple jump with a distance of 13.93. Prior to that, in the same month representing the University of Texas she had reached the finals of the NCAA championships in both events finishing eighth in the long jump (6.34m) and fourth in the triple jump (13.79m). Selected for the 2022 World Athletics Championships in the triple jump, Smith scored a big personal best of 14.36m to qualify for the final on her senior major championship debut. In the final Smith jumped 13.90m to finish in 12th place. Smith was selected for the long jump at the 2022 Commonwealth Games held in Birmingham, England and qualified for the final with a jump of 6.35 metres.

References

External links
 
 Texas Longhorns bio

2002 births
Living people
Jamaican female triple jumpers
World Athletics Championships athletes for Jamaica
Texas Longhorns women's track and field athletes
21st-century Jamaican women